Elections were held in the  Caraga for seats in the House of Representatives of the Philippines on May 10, 2010.

The candidate with the most votes won that district's seat for the 15th Congress of the Philippines.

Summary

Agusan del Norte

1st District
Jose Aquino II is the incumbent.

2nd District
Incumbent Edelmiro Amante is retiring from politics. His daughter Angelica is his party's nominee in this district.

Agusan del Sur

Agusan del Sur will have two districts starting for the 15th Congress. Rodolfo Plaza, who is serving in his third consecutive term and is ineligible for reelection, is the last representative of Agusan del Sur's at-large district.

1st District
Rodolfo Plaza's sister, incumbent governor Maria Valentina, will run in this district.

2nd District

Dinagat Islands

With the Supreme Court nullifying the law that created the province still not yet final, elections proceeded to elect the province's representative. Incumbent Glenda Ecleo will not run in favor of her son Ruben Jr.

Surigao del Norte

1st District
Francisco Matugas is the incumbent.

The result of the election is under protest in the House of Representatives Electoral Tribunal.

2nd District
Guillermo Romarate, Jr. is the incumbent.

Surigao del Sur

1st District
Philip Pichay is the incumbent.

2nd District
Florencio Garay is the incumbent.

References

External links
Official website of the Commission on Elections

2010 Philippine general election
2010